Hygrophorus speciosus is a species of fungus in the genus Hygrophorus. While edible, the flavor of most Hygrophorus species is considered bland.

It has a bright red-orange cap which yellows with age, and a white or yellow stem; both are slimy, but the fruit bodies are less so with age. The gills are whitish to light yellow, and decurrent.

The species can be found inland within the Pacific Northwest, in areas where larch is plentiful.

Hygrophorus hypothejus is a similar species.

References

speciosus
Edible fungi
Fungi of North America
Fungi described in 1878
Taxa named by Charles Horton Peck